Morgan Ågren (born 1967) is a Swedish drummer who plays with the progressive rock band Kaipa.

Biography
A native of Umeå, Västerbotten, Ågren was spotted as an outstanding talent at a young age as he began performing publicly at age seven, and eventually joined forces with Mats Öberg in 1981.

They later formed "Zappsteetoot" together in 1984, a band internationally known for performing Frank Zappa's music.

In 1988, at the age of 20, Morgan Ågren was, along with Mats Öberg, invited by Frank Zappa to do a guest performance at Zappa's Stockholm concert. Impressed by Ågren's skills, Zappa invited Ågren to the States to partake in several projects, including the 1994 Grammy Award-winning CD Zappa's Universe with Steve Vai, as well as a sold out New York performance of Zappa's classical program at Lincoln Center's Great Performers Series in Avery Fisher Hall. Ågren also shares the drummer's seat with Terry Bozzio on Dweezil and Ahmet Zappa's band AZ/DZ's album Shampoohorn. In 1996, Ågren toured throughout Europe as a member of Glenn Hughes's band, and later to Japan in 1997. 1996 also saw the formation of Morgan Ågren's own record label, Ultimate Audio Entertainment, dedicated to the release of "new" music.

Ågren has recorded several albums as a member of Fleshquartet (Swedish: Fläskkvartetten), among them What's Your Pleasure? and the Grammy Award-winning Goodbye Sweden in addition to his international performances with Zappa's Universe and with Mats Öberg in Mats/Morgan Band.

Ågren is also the drummer in the Swedish prog band Kaipa since 2002, recording several albums with the band.

In May 1997, Ågren was featured in a unique project of the Swedish Film Institute, making his debut in movie theaters and at several international film festivals. Described as a sound experience, the 4-minute 35 mm short-film Lullaby for Lost Souls showcases him in "a free-form Stereo Dolby drum explosion".

Ågren is also highly recognized by fans of extreme and heavy music for his studio performance on Fredrik Thordendal's solo album, Sol Niger Within, released in 1997.

He is the subject of a 2013 two-hour documentary directed by Carl King a.k.a. Sir Millard Mulch, called Morgan Ågren's Conundrum: A Percussive Misadventure. It also features Devin Townsend, Dweezil Zappa, and Brendon Small, creator of Metalocalypse.

Ågren was also featured on the eponymous album by Casualties of Cool.

Discography

Solo 
 2015 – Batterie Deluxe
 2016 – Through the Eyes of a Morgchestra

Mats/Morgan Band 
 1996 – Trends and Other Diseases
 1997 – The Music or the Money
 1998 – Radio DaDa
 1998 – The Teenage Tapes
 2001 – Live
 2002 – On Air with Guests
 2005 – Thanks for Flying with Us
 2008 – Heat Beats Live (+ Tourbook 1991–2007) (DVD+CD)
 2014 – Schack Tati
 2016 – 35th Anniversary Collection
 2018 – Live with Norrlandsoperan Symphony Orchestra

Kaipa 
Notes from the Past (2002)
Keyholder (2003)
Mindrevolutions (2005)
Angling Feelings (2007)
In the Wake of Evolution (2010)
Vittjar (2012)
Sattyg (2014)
Children of the Sounds (2017)

With other artists 
 1987 – Chinese Garden — Cabazz
 1990 – Far Away — Cabazz
 1988 – What's Your Pleasure? – Fläskkvartetten
 1990 – Goodbye Sweden — Fläskkvartetten
 1993 – Open Your Eyes — Agamon
 1993 – Zappa's Universe — various artists
 1993 – Flow — Fläskkvartetten
 1994 – Shampoohorn — Dweezil & Ahmet Zappa
 1995 – The Zombie Hunter (APM) — Simon Steensland
 1996 – The Music of Captain Beefheart – Live — various artists
 1997 – Spare Parts — Denny Walley
 1997 – Sol Niger Within — Fredrik Thordendal's Special Defects
 1999 – Led Circus — Simon Steensland
 2000 – Automatic — Dweezil Zappa
 2001 – Glass Finger Ghost — Jimmy Ågren
 2003 – Close Enough for Jazz — Jimmy Ågren
 2011 – BLIXT — Morgan Ågren, Raoul Björkenheim & Bill Laswell
 2013 – Freak Guitar: The Smorgasbord – Mattias IA Eklundh
 2013 – Into the Void of Fear – Octopus
 2014 – Casualties of Cool – Devin Townsend
 2019 – Empath – Devin Townsend
 2019 – Zëss – Magma
 2019 – Requiem – Evan Marien & Fredrik Thordendal
 2020 – Of the Sky – Hassan Iqbal
 2023 – Layers – Anatole Muster (feat. Hadrien Feraud & Morgan Ågren)

References 

1967 births
Living people
People from Umeå
Swedish drummers
Male drummers
Kaipa members
Soul Enterprise members